Transformer is the second solo album by former Kiss guitarist Bruce Kulick, released in 2003 by Perris Records. It was produced by Bruce Kulick, Stephan Hanuman and Curt Cuomo, and its cover was designed by Jim Bovin. The album features drummer Brent Fitz and vocalist John Corabi, both of whom Bruce had worked with in the band Union. Curt Cuomo provided backing vocals on the album, and Tim Cashion of Grand Funk Railroad played keyboards.

Track listing
All songs written by Bruce Kulick. All are sung by Kulick except where noted.

Personnel
 Bruce Kulick - Vocals, Guitar, Bass, Mandolin, Dulcimer
 John Corabi - vocals on "Its Just My Life"
 Brent Fitz - drums
 Tim Cashion - keyboards
 Curt Cuomo - backing vocals

References

Bruce Kulick albums
2003 albums